Anthony William Whiteman (born 13 November 1971) is a male British former middle distance runner who competed in the 1996 Summer Olympics and in the 2000 Summer Olympics.

Athletics career
Following the 1996 Summer Olympics he won the 1997 World University Games 1500 metres. He represented England and won a bronze medal in the 1,500 metres event, at the 1998 Commonwealth Games in Kuala Lumpur, Malaysia.

A second appearance at the Olympic Games ensued when he ran in the heats of the 1500 and two years later he competed in the 1500 metres once again, at the 2002 Commonwealth Games.

Now a master (over 40), he currently has the world record in that age group for 800 metres and pending records for the mile and 1500 metres. He has run 3:32.24 for 1500m and has a best mile time of 3:51.90.

He is a member of the Shaftesbury Barnet club.

Competition record

References

1971 births
Living people
Olympic athletes of Great Britain
Athletes (track and field) at the 1996 Summer Olympics
Athletes (track and field) at the 2000 Summer Olympics
Athletes (track and field) at the 1998 Commonwealth Games
Athletes (track and field) at the 2002 Commonwealth Games
World record holders in masters athletics
British masters athletes
English male middle-distance runners
People from Carshalton
Athletes from London
Commonwealth Games medallists in athletics
World Athletics Championships athletes for Great Britain
Commonwealth Games bronze medallists for England
Universiade medalists in athletics (track and field)
Universiade gold medalists for Great Britain
Medalists at the 1997 Summer Universiade
Medallists at the 1998 Commonwealth Games